Yurino is the name of several inhabited localities in Russia.

Ivanovo Oblast
As of 2010, two rural localities in Ivanovo Oblast bear this name:
Yurino, Verkhnelandekhovsky District, Ivanovo Oblast, a village in Verkhnelandekhovsky District
Yurino, Vichugsky District, Ivanovo Oblast, a village in Vichugsky District

Kaluga Oblast
As of 2010, one rural locality in Kaluga Oblast bears this name:
Yurino, Kaluga Oblast, a village in Kozelsky District

Kirov Oblast
As of 2010, one rural locality in Kirov Oblast bears this name:
Yurino, Kirov Oblast, a village in Kichminsky Rural Okrug of Sovetsky District

Kostroma Oblast
As of 2010, two rural localities in Kostroma Oblast bear this name:
Yurino, Kologrivsky District, Kostroma Oblast, a village in Ilyinskoye Settlement of Kologrivsky District
Yurino, Krasnoselsky District, Kostroma Oblast, a village in Sidorovskoye Settlement of Krasnoselsky District

Mari El Republic
As of 2010, one urban locality in the Mari El Republic bears this name:
Yurino, Mari El Republic, an urban-type settlement in Yurinsky District

Moscow Oblast
As of 2010, one rural locality in Moscow Oblast bears this name:
Yurino, Moscow Oblast, a village in Kvashenkovskoye Rural Settlement of Taldomsky District

Nizhny Novgorod Oblast
As of 2010, two rural localities in Nizhny Novgorod Oblast bear this name:
Yurino, Bor, Nizhny Novgorod Oblast, a village in Lindovsky Selsoviet under the administrative jurisdiction of the town of oblast significance of Bor
Yurino, Balakhninsky District, Nizhny Novgorod Oblast, a village in Konevsky Selsoviet of Balakhninsky District

Novgorod Oblast
As of 2010, one rural locality in Novgorod Oblast bears this name:
Yurino, Novgorod Oblast, a village in Progresskoye Settlement of Borovichsky District

Pskov Oblast
As of 2010, three rural localities in Pskov Oblast bear this name:
Yurino, Opochetsky District, Pskov Oblast, a village in Opochetsky District
Yurino, Ostrovsky District, Pskov Oblast, a village in Ostrovsky District
Yurino, Porkhovsky District, Pskov Oblast, a village in Porkhovsky District

Ryazan Oblast
As of 2010, one rural locality in Ryazan Oblast bears this name:
Yurino, Ryazan Oblast, a selo in Kaverinsky Rural Okrug of Shatsky District

Smolensk Oblast
As of 2010, three rural localities in Smolensk Oblast bear this name:
Yurino, Gagarinsky District, Smolensk Oblast, a village in Gagarinskoye Rural Settlement of Gagarinsky District
Yurino, Tyomkinsky District, Smolensk Oblast, a village in Batyushkovskoye Rural Settlement of Tyomkinsky District
Yurino, Vyazemsky District, Smolensk Oblast, a village in Kaydakovskoye Rural Settlement of Vyazemsky District

Tver Oblast
As of 2010, three rural localities in Tver Oblast bear this name:
Yurino, Kashinsky District, Tver Oblast, a village in Pestrikovskoye Rural Settlement of Kashinsky District
Yurino, Kimrsky District, Tver Oblast, a village in Tsentralnoye Rural Settlement of Kimrsky District
Yurino, Zubtsovsky District, Tver Oblast, a village in Stolipinskoye Rural Settlement of Zubtsovsky District

Udmurt Republic
As of 2010, one rural locality in the Udmurt Republic bears this name:
Yurino, Udmurt Republic, a village in Yurinsky Selsoviet of Sarapulsky District

Vladimir Oblast
As of 2010, three rural localities in Vladimir Oblast bear this name:
Yurino, Kovrovsky District, Vladimir Oblast, a village in Kovrovsky District
Yurino (Cherkutinskoye Rural Settlement), Sobinsky District, Vladimir Oblast, a village in Sobinsky District; municipally, a part of Cherkutinskoye Rural Settlement of that district
Yurino (Vorshinskoye Rural Settlement), Sobinsky District, Vladimir Oblast, a village in Sobinsky District; municipally, a part of Vorshinskoye Rural Settlement of that district

Vologda Oblast
As of 2010, three rural localities in Vologda Oblast bear this name:
Yurino, Paninsky Selsoviet, Belozersky District, Vologda Oblast, a village in Paninsky Selsoviet of Belozersky District
Yurino, Sholsky Selsoviet, Belozersky District, Vologda Oblast, a village in Sholsky Selsoviet of Belozersky District
Yurino, Kaduysky District, Vologda Oblast, a village in Velikoselsky Selsoviet of Kaduysky District

Yaroslavl Oblast
As of 2010, six rural localities in Yaroslavl Oblast bear this name:
Yurino, Danilovsky District, Yaroslavl Oblast, a village in Slobodskoy Rural Okrug of Danilovsky District
Yurino, Pereslavsky District, Yaroslavl Oblast, a village in Glebovsky Rural Okrug of Pereslavsky District
Yurino, Glebovsky Rural Okrug, Rybinsky District, Yaroslavl Oblast, a village in Glebovsky Rural Okrug of Rybinsky District
Yurino, Makarovsky Rural Okrug, Rybinsky District, Yaroslavl Oblast, a village in Makarovsky Rural Okrug of Rybinsky District
Yurino, Uglichsky District, Yaroslavl Oblast, a village in Otradnovsky Rural Okrug of Uglichsky District
Yurino, Yaroslavsky District, Yaroslavl Oblast, a village in Kurbsky Rural Okrug of Yaroslavsky District